Lexington is a city in Henderson County, Tennessee, United States. The population was 7,956 at the 2020 census. It is the county seat of Henderson County.

History
Shortly after the 1821 creation of Henderson County, a site near its center was chosen as a county seat, and was named in honor of Lexington, Massachusetts, site of the first battle of the American Revolution. Land Grant holder Samuel Wilson gave the land for the town, retaining a lot on the square where his house was already situated.  The square is oriented so the corners point to the cardinal points on the compass. The first county courthouse was built in 1823; Lexington was incorporated in 1824 and by 1830 had a population of 260.

As the lead-up to the Civil War began, Henderson County voted against secession. As the war progressed, both Union and Confederate regiments were recruited in the county. The area in and around Lexington was the site of a skirmish on December 18, 1862. Union Colonel Robert Ingersoll sent his troops to destroy a bridge over Beech Creek to disallow the Confederate army moving into the area. However, Ingersoll's troops did not destroy the bridge, and General Nathan Bedford Forrest's troops headed into Lexington. Forrest's troops overtook the Union soldiers, taking over 140 men, including Colonel Ingersoll, and collected artillery and supplies left behind by Union soldiers who escaped.

In 1918, an African-American man called Berry Noyse who was accused of killing the sheriff was lynched by a mob in the courthouse square and burned in the street.

Geography 
Lexington is in central Henderson County. U.S. Route 412 (Church Street) is the main road through the city, leading east  to Columbia and west  to Jackson. Tennessee State Route 22 (Broad Street) crosses US 412 in the center of Lexington, leading north  to Interstate 40 at Parkers Crossroads and south  to Milledgeville.

The Beech River, an east-flowing tributary of the Tennessee River, runs through the southwestern part of the city.

Demographics

2020 census

As of the 2020 United States census, there were 7,956 people, 3,150 households, and 1,915 families residing in the city.

2000 census
As of the census of 2000, the population density was 640.4 people per square mile (247.4/km2). There were 3,371 housing units at an average density of 292.0 per square mile (112.8/km2). The racial makeup of the city was 84.50% White, 13.07% African American, 0.14% Native American, 0.26% Asian, 0.03% Pacific Islander, 0.42% from other races, and 1.60% from two or more races. Hispanic or Latino of any race were 1.18% of the population.

There were 3,039 households, out of which 31.2% had children under the age of 18 living with them, 48.8% were married couples living together, 14.5% had a female householder with no husband present, and 33.0% were non-families. 30.4% of all households were made up of individuals, and 12.9% had someone living alone who was 65 years of age or older. The average household size was 2.32 and the average family size was 2.88.

In the city, the population was spread out, with 24.0% under the age of 18, 8.4% from 18 to 24, 28.3% from 25 to 44, 22.3% from 45 to 64, and 17.0% who were 65 years of age or older. The median age was 38 years. For every 100 females, there were 85.7 males. For every 100 females age 18 and over, there were 80.7 males.

The median income for a household in the city was $29,725, and the median income for a family was $41,429. Males had a median income of $31,558 versus $23,212 for females. The per capita income for the city was $18,368. About 10.2% of families and 13.2% of the population were below the poverty line, including 14.9% of those under age 18 and 12.8% of those age 65 or over.

Education

Public schools in Lexington are operated by the Henderson County School System and the Lexington City School System. There are three schools: Paul G. Caywood Elementary School, Lexington Middle School and Lexington High School. Lexington High School is in the Henderson County School System, while Paul G. Caywood Elementary School, often shortened to "Caywood," and Lexington Middle School, or LMS, are both in the Lexington City School System.

Lexington is home to the Lexington-Henderson County Center of Jackson State Community College, which opened in 1999. The center offers all courses required to earn an associate degree in General Studies, and offers other courses that may be credited towards additional degrees from the main campus in Jackson, Tennessee, or may be transferred to other universities. It has become a popular choice of graduates from Lexington High School, Scotts Hill High School, and other area high schools as a means of continuing their education. The center has become more popular since the introduction of the Tennessee Promise, a state program that provides two years of tuition-free attendance at community colleges and technical colleges in Tennessee.

Newspapers
The Lexington Progress, since 1884
Tennessee Magnet Publications

Arts and culture

The Lexington-Henderson County Everett Horn Public Library serves the city.

Lexington is home to the very popular Beech Lake. Lexington has one museum, Beech River Heritage Museum, that holds a variety of historical artifacts of Lexington and Henderson County.

Lexington was the setting of a 1994 episode of The X-Files called "E.B.E."

Lexington claims to be the barbecue capital of the country; it supposedly has more barbecue restaurants per capita than any other city in the United States.

Infrastructure

Henderson County Community Hospital is located in and serves the Lexington area.

Sports 
From 1935 to 1938, Lexington was home to a Minor League Baseball team that played in the Kentucky–Illinois–Tennessee League. Known as the Lexington Giants from 1935 to 1938, the team was renamed the Lexington Bees when it became a farm club of the National League's Boston Bees in 1938.

Notable people 

 Dick Barry, lawyer and legislator
 Buddy Cannon, record producer
 Doug Gilbert, professional wrestler
 Eddie Gilbert, professional wrestler
 John McAfee, founder of McAfee Associates, former resident
 Sam Taylor, saxophonist

References

External links
Official website

Cities in Tennessee
Cities in Henderson County, Tennessee
County seats in Tennessee
1821 establishments in Tennessee